Vásárhelyi ( = marketplace or fairgrounds) is a Hungarian surname. Notable people with the surname include:

 Elizabeth Chai Vasarhelyi, American documentary filmmaker
 Miklós Vásárhelyi, Hungarian journalist and politician
 Pál Vásárhelyi, Hungarian competitive ice dancer

Hungarian-language surnames